The women's madison at the 2012 Dutch National Track Championships in Apeldoorn took place at Omnisport Apeldoorn on December 30, 2012. 9 teams participated in the contest.

Competition format
Because of the number of teams, there were no qualification rounds for this discipline. Consequently, the event was run direct to the final. The competition consisted on 100 laps, making a total of 25 km.

Preview
Ellen van Dijk who won the national madison title in 2011, together with Kirsten Wild, did not participate at the 2012 National Track Championships. Wild rode in this edition together with Laura van der Kamp.

Results
The race started at 20:15.

Results from nkbaanwielrennen.nl.

References

2012 Dutch National track cycling championships
Track cycling